Gordon McClellan  is a Canadian film editor.

His editing credits include the award-winning television series Road to Avonlea (38 episodes, from 1990–1996); Francis Mankiewicz's Love and Hate: The Story of Colin and Joanne Thatcher; Clay Borris' Alligator Shoes, and Allan King's Leonardo: A Dream of Flight (1999).  He is a three-time Gemini Award nominee.

McClellan is a member of the Canadian Cinema Editors honours society.

Recognition
2003 Directors Guild of Canada DGC Craft Award for "Outstanding Achievement in Picture Editing - Witchblade- Nominee
1998 Gemini Award for "Best Picture Editing in a Dramatic Program or Series" - Giant Mine- Nominee
1993 Gemini Award for "Best Picture Editing in a Dramatic Program or Series" - Road to Avonlea - Nominee
1990 Gemini Award for "Best Picture Editing in a Dramatic Program or Series" - Love and Hate: The Story of Colin and Joanne Thatcher – Nominee
1982 Genie Award for "Best Achievement in Film Editing" - Alligator Shoes - Nominee

References

External links
 

Canadian film editors
Living people
Year of birth missing (living people)